Paul Rapoport (born 1948) is a Canadian musicologist, music critic, composer and professor at McMaster University in Hamilton, Ontario.

Biography 
Rapoport was born in 1948 in Toronto, Ontario. He received his bachelor's degree in linguistics and music at the University of Michigan in 1970 and his master's degree at the University of Illinois at Urbana–Champaign in 1972 with a thesis on Havergal Brian's Gothic Symphony. He went on to gain a doctorate at the same university in 1975, with a dissertation about Vagn Holmboe's four Symphonic Metamorphoses.

Part of the substantial collection of material related to composer Kaikhosru Shapurji Sorabji at McMaster University's library was obtained in 1988 through Rapoport's efforts. In addition to his work on Sorabji, he has been most associated with the music of Havergal Brian, Vagn Holmboe and Allan Pettersson as well as with various aspects of microtonal music. He has made use of microtones in his own compositions, which include a set of partsongs to poems by Erica Jong. As a critic he wrote mostly for the American magazine Fanfare, but also for Tempo, the American Record Guide, and others.

Bibliography

Books

Articles

Notes 

1948 births
Living people
Canadian male composers
Canadian music critics
Academic staff of McMaster University
Musicians from Toronto
University of Illinois at Urbana–Champaign School of Music alumni
University of Michigan alumni